Jordan David Parkes (born 26 July 1989) is an English footballer  midfielder.

Playing career
Parkes left Parmiter's School in Garston, Hertfordshire at sixteen to pursue a football career at Watford. His debut came in a 2006 League Cup second round tie against Accrington Stanley, in which he scored a penalty in the shootout, won 6–5 by Watford.

Parkes signed his first professional contract with Watford on 1 February 2007. In March 2007, Parkes was called up to the England under-18 squad by manager Brian Eastick, making his debut in the 4–1 win against Holland. He has subsequently been called up by England under-19's.

In the 2007–08 season Parkes was loaned to League Two sides Brentford and Barnet . He made his league debut for Watford on 30 August 2008 against Ipswich Town, replacing the injured Mat Sadler. In November of that year he captained Watford U20s away to Inter Milan, against a side that included Hernan Crespo, Adriano, Walter Samuel and Olivier Dacourt.

On 29 July 2009, Parkes scored twice in a 4–1 win for a strong Watford side against St Albans City. In September 2009, he was selected for the England national under-20 football team and played in the 2009 FIFA U-20 World Cup in Egypt against Uzbekistan, setting up England's first goal in the competition for 12 years.

On 21 June 2010, Parkes was released from his contract with Watford. He subsequently joined Barnet. He went on to make 51 appearances and left in May 2012, with the expiry of his contract. In August 2012 he joined Chelmsford City  and signed a contract at Melbourne Park, however in October 2012 he left by mutual consent and joined his hometown club Hemel Hempstead Town moving into midfield where he made 40 appearances in the 2012–13 season, scoring 12 goals (6 in the league) and captaining the side to the play-off finals. In 2013–14 he captained Hemel Hempstead  to the Southern Premier Division League title and secured promotion into the Conference South, making 51 appearances in all competitions, scoring 24 goals (16 in the league) and being named in the Southern Premier League Team of the Year.

In 2014-15 Parkes captained Hemel Hempstead  to their highest league position of 9th in the Conference South, winning 2 Cup competitions and scoring 30 goals in 56 appearances. He finished third in the Conference South goal scorers table with 21 and won the Players Player, Supporters Player & Managers Player of the Year Awards, as well as the Gazette player of the year. He was also named in the Conference South Team of the Year and received the prestigious Conference South Player of the Year Trophy at The Conference Annual Awards in June 2015.

In 2015, after three years at Hemel Hempstead, Parkes joined fellow Conference South side Ebbsfleet United. for an undisclosed fee. Parkes re-joined Hemel for the 2016–17 season, becoming Hemel Hempstead FC all time top goal scorer with 109 goals.

In May 2019, Parked joined Billericay Town.

Parkes joined Southern League Premier Division Central side Kings Langley on 12 November 2019 as a player-coach.

Career statistics

References

External links

1989 births
Living people
English footballers
Association football midfielders
Watford F.C. players
Brentford F.C. players
Barnet F.C. players
Stevenage F.C. players
Farnborough F.C. players
Chelmsford City F.C. players
Hemel Hempstead Town F.C. players
Ebbsfleet United F.C. players
Billericay Town F.C. players
Kings Langley F.C. players
English Football League players
Southern Football League players
National League (English football) players
England youth international footballers
People educated at Parmiter's School, Garston